Land of Hunted Men is a 1943 American Western film directed by S. Roy Luby. The film is the twenty-first in Monogram Pictures' "Range Busters" series and it stars Ray "Crash" Corrigan as Crash, Dennis Moore as Denny and Max Terhune as Alibi, with Phyllis Adair, Charles King and John Merton.

In the final four "Range Busters" movies, "Crash" Corrigan returned to the series, and starred alongside Dennis Moore and Max Terhune, replacing John "Dusty" King and "Davy" Sharpe.

Plot

Cast

Soundtrack 
 "Trail to Mexico" (Written by Johnny Lange and Lew Porter)

See also
The Range Busters series:
 The Range Busters (1940)
 Trailing Double Trouble (1940)
 West of Pinto Basin (1940)
 Trail of the Silver Spurs (1941)
 The Kid's Last Ride (1941)
 Tumbledown Ranch in Arizona (1941)
 Wrangler's Roost (1941)
 Fugitive Valley (1941)
 Saddle Mountain Roundup (1941)
 Tonto Basin Outlaws (1941)
 Underground Rustlers (1941)
 Thunder River Feud (1942)
 Rock River Renegades (1942)
 Boot Hill Bandits (1942)
 Texas Trouble Shooters (1942)
 Arizona Stage Coach (1942)
 Texas to Bataan (1942)
 Trail Riders (1942)
 Two Fisted Justice (1943)
 Haunted Ranch (1943)
 Land of Hunted Men (1943)
 Cowboy Commandos (1943)
 Black Market Rustlers (1943)
 Bullets and Saddles (1943)

External links 

1943 films
American Western (genre) films
American action adventure films
1940s English-language films
American black-and-white films
1943 Western (genre) films
1943 adventure films
Monogram Pictures films
Films directed by S. Roy Luby
Range Busters
1940s American films